Júlio de Castilhos Museum is a museum located in the city of Porto Alegre (Rio Grande do Sul, Brazil). It is the oldest museum in Rio Grande do Sul state.

Its collection, over 10 thousand pieces, is Brazilian national heritage, and comprises objects of historical, artistic, ethnographic and archaeological character, mostly related to the history of Rio Grande do Sul. Its sections for the Ragamuffin War and the Paraguayan War are specially rich. The museum also preserves a few but very important examples of sculptures produced within Indian Reductions by Jesuits and indigenous peoples.

References

External links 
 Museum website 

Museums in Porto Alegre
Art museums and galleries in Brazil
Castilhos, Julio de
Culture in Rio Grande do Sul
History museums in Brazil
Decorative arts museums in Brazil